Jorge Luis Moreno (born December 19, 1981, in Hermosillo, Sonora, Mexico) as Jorge Luis Moreno Abril, is a Mexican actor, producer, writer and director.

Filmography

Film roles

Television roles

External links
 

1981 births
Living people
Mexican male film actors
Mexican male telenovela actors
Male actors from Sonora
People from Hermosillo
21st-century Mexican male actors